"Baby Good Night" (Korean:  Jaljayo Good Night; Japanese:  Oyasumi, Good Night), also known as Sleep Well, Good Night, is the third and lead single from the repackaged edition of B1A4's album Ignition. A Japanese version of the song was released on August 29, 2012 as the group's second Japanese single.

Composition
The song was written by the members Baro and Jinyoung, who also composed the song. In the special edition of the album Ignition, the song is listed as track 1. An instrumental version of the song was also included as track 13.

Promotions
The TV promotions of the song started on May 25, 2012 on KBS Music Bank. It was also promoted on the shows Show! Music Core and Inkigayo.  The promotions of the song and album ended on June 23, 2012, on MBC's Show! Music Core.

Music video
The music video was released on May 24, 2012, along with the repackaged album digital release. The music video  features ESteem model, Joo Sunyoung.

Chart performance
The song debuted at number 23 in Gaon's Weekly singles chart in the week of September 27, 2012, with 11,776,275 points. On the following week the song climbed ten positions and charted at number 13, the current peak of the song. It dropped back to number 23 on the following week.

Charts

Japanese version

After promoting the song in South Korea, the Japanese version of the song was announced as the group's second Japanese single. It will be released on August 29, 2012 in 3 editions: CD+DVD, CD+Goods and a Regular edition.

Composition
The song was originally written by the members Jinyoung and Baro, and translated in Japanese by MEG.ME. The b-side "Baby I'm Sorry" and bonus track "So Fine" were originally recorded in Korean, released on the album Ignition. "Fly Away", bonus track of the Regular edition, is an original Japanese song.

Track listing

Charts

Oricon

Release history

References

2012 singles
Korean-language songs
Japanese-language songs
Dance-pop songs
South Korean songs
2012 songs
Pony Canyon singles